Alexander J. Pires Jr. is an American lawyer and entrepreneur.

Early life 

Both sides of his family came from the small village of Madalena do Mar on the island of Madeira off of Portugal.

Pires attended the University of Miami and then Boston University, graduating in 1969. Pires attended George Washington University Law School and received a JD in 1972 and an LLM in 1978 in taxation.

Pires was drafted during the Vietnam War and entered the ROTC program at Georgetown. He was commissioned as a Second Lieutenant in 1972. In 1980, Pires was honorably discharged with a final rank of Major.

Career

Government service 

Upon graduating from GWU Law in 1972, Pires was accepted into the Attorney General's Honors Program at the United States Department of Justice. Pires then became a senior trial attorney in the DOJ Antitrust Division where he was on the trial team responsible for the breakup of AT&T. Pires served eight years on the Board of Directors of the Federal Justice Credit Union, including four years as its president. In 1980, Pires was appointed by President Jimmy Carter as Deputy Assistant Secretary of the United States Department of Housing and Urban Development.

Private practice 

Pires joined Barnett & Alagia in 1981, representing farmers while specializing in agricultural law. Pires joined the firm of Scott, Harrison & McLeod, which evolved into McLeod & Pires. In 1991, Pires joined the firm of Conlon Frantz Phelan & Pires, where he remained for 12 years, and then formed a law practice with his wife.

In 1997, Pires and attorney Phil Fraas agreed to take on the case of eleven black farmers who alleged they had been discriminated against by the USDA, although the statute of limitations had expired. In September 1997, Pires and Frass filed Pigford v. Glickman in US District Court for the District of Columbia, naming hundreds of plaintiffs and asking the court to certify a class. Within a few months, civil rights leader and attorney J.L. Chestnut joined Pires and Fraas, and the case was allowed to proceed. In 1999, they entered into a consent decree in which most of the farmers obtained a cash payment of $50,000 along with debt relief if they could show that they tried and failed to borrow money from the USDA and that similarly situated white farmers had been approved at the same time they were denied. When tens of thousands of farmers filed claims, Pires and his fellow attorneys began missing deadlines, leading the judge to observe that their conduct "border[ed] on legal malpractice". At one point in the litigation, Pires stated that he had never intended to meet the district court's filing deadlines, and the judge solicited pro bono assistance from law firms in the District of Columbia. In part because of decisions made by Pires and his co-counsel, thousands of farmers were also denied relief despite Pires's assurance that there was "certainty" in their success. However, total relief for the farmers was approximately $1,200,000,000, at that time, the largest recovery ever in a civil rights case. 

Pires was also involved in a class action suits against the USDA involving farmers who were Native American, Hispanic, or women.

Highway One Group 
In 1989, Pires formed the Highway One Group, which owns music venues, bars, restaurants and hotels in Delaware, employing 450 people.

Teaching 
Pires taught a course on civil discovery at Georgetown University Law Center from 1998 to 2000 as an adjunct professor of law.

Community Bank Delaware 
In July 2006, Pires formed Community Bank Delaware, with offices in Lewes and Rehoboth Beach, Delaware. Pires is Chairman of the Board and Chief Executive Officer. As of December 31, 2022, Community Bank Delaware has assets of $311,835,000 and 41 employees. The bank donates 4% of its profits to local charities and families of need.

Film 
In 2009, Pires co-wrote, produced, and directed the film Mayor Cupcake, with a personal investment of $400,000. The film was shot entirely in Delaware and tells the story of an uneducated cupcake baker who becomes the mayor of a small town. The film features Lea Thompson, Judd Nelson, Frankie Faison, and Dorian Harewood.

2012 Senate campaign 

Pires ran as the Independent Party of Delaware candidate in the United States Senate election in Delaware, 2012. He lost to incumbent Senator Tom Carper, receiving 3.8% of the votes.

References 

Delaware lawyers
Businesspeople from Delaware
1947 births
Living people
Candidates in the 2012 United States elections
Independent Party of Delaware politicians
Boston University alumni
University of Miami alumni
George Washington University Law School alumni